Sakutumba Sametha is a 2022 Indian Kannada-language romantic comedy film written and directed by Rahul PK, and produced by Rakshit Shetty under Paramvah Studios. The film stars  Bharath G B and Siri Ravikumar with a music score by Midhun Mukundan . It was released in India on 20 May 2022.

Plot

The Movie begins with the introduction of Suresh (Bharath GB) and Shraddha (Siri Ravikumar) who have matched through an online matrimonial site to get married, Shraddha has reservations about going ahead with the wedding, One week before her wedding she chooses to express to her parents and Suresh. A meeting between the two dysfunctional families follows story that takes place in one house, Which gives the opportunity to know each other's family and they get bonded along, some Egos will be hurt, Some hearts will be broken and some hearts will be mended too.

Cast

 Bharath GB  as Suri
 Siri Ravikumar  as  Shraddha
 Achyuth Kumar as Sathyamurthy
 Krishna Hebbale as Giri
 Pushpa Belwadi as Geetha
 Rekha Kudligi as Vimalla 
 Jayalaxmi Patil as Haya
 Gowtham Upadya as Babu 
 Shankar Murthy SR

Home media 

The film is available to stream on OTT platform Voot from 2 september 2022
while its satellite rights were acquired by Colors Kannada.

Reception

Reviewing Sakutumba Sametha, Sunayana Suresh of The Times of India gave rating of 3 out of 5, praising it as, cinema with soul and simplicity.
For the The New Indian Express, A.Sharadhaa gave rating of 3 out of 5 and wrote  "While the direction deserves applause, equal credit should also go to writer Pooja Sudhir, who captures delightful nuggets about family life. The music by Midhun Mukundan is a plus and goes well with the film, which has each actor playing to their strengths in author-backed roles."

References

External links

2022 films
Films set in Karnataka
2020s Kannada-language films
Films shot in Karnataka
2022 romantic drama films
Indian romantic drama films
Kannada films remade in other languages